Associação Esportiva Araçatuba, more commonly referred to as Araçatuba, is a Brazilian football club based in Araçatuba, São Paulo. The team compete in Campeonato Paulista Segunda Divisão, the fourth tier of the São Paulo state football league.

 
Association football clubs established in 1972
1972 establishments in Brazil